Brad Rogers is an American football official in the National Football League (NFL) since the 2017 NFL season, wearing uniform number 126.

Career
Rogers began officiating in 1991, working Texas high school football games. From there, Rogers became an official in the Southeastern Conference and Conference USA, where he worked at the center judge and referee positions. In 2015, Rogers worked NFL preseason games as part of the league's Officiating Development Program.

Rogers was hired by the NFL in 2017 as a field judge, and was promoted to referee with the start of the 2019 NFL season following the retirement of John Parry. He worked on the crews of Pete Morelli and Shawn Smith before being promoted to referee.

2022 Crew 

 R: Brad Rogers
 U: Carl Paganelli
 DJ: Kent Payne
 LJ: Tom Eaton
 FJ: Aaron Santi
 SJ: Anthony Jeffries
 BJ: Greg Steed
 RO: Bob Hubbell
 RA: Durwood Manley

Personal life
Rogers resides in Lubbock, Texas. Outside of the NFL, Rogers is a professor in the business department at his alma mater, Lubbock Christian University. He is also a professor in the Management department at Texas Tech University.

References

Living people
National Football League officials
Year of birth missing (living people)